Xylotrupes ulysses, common names "Elephant beetle", "Coconut palm beetle", "common rhinoceros beetle" or simply "rhinoceros beetle" is a species of rhinoceros beetle native to New Guinea. Male horns in several groups of this genus represent a special secondary sex characteristic. There is a bimodal horn-size distribution and there is a discrete male mating behavior correlated with each phenotype.

Gallery

See also
 Xylotrupes gideon
 Elephant beetle
 Rhinoceros beetle

References

External links
 Xylotrupes ulysses at the Atlas of Living Australia

Dynastinae
Beetles of Australia
Beetles described in 1830